Sci-Fi Crimes is the fifth studio album by American rock band Chevelle, released on August 31, 2009 through Epic Records.

Background
The album was recorded in Nashville, Tennessee, in 2009 with producer Brian Virtue. On April 9, 2009, Chevelle debuted two new songs, "Letter from a Thief" and "Sleep Apnea" at a concert in Atlanta, Georgia. Vocalist Pete Loeffler stated that the tracks were "possible singles" off the album. "Jars" was the first single from the album and began radio airplay on June 23. The track list and artwork were revealed July 21, 2009, in addition to a pre-order being made available which included the ability to download three tracks: "Jars", "This Circus", and "The Clincher (Version 103)" (an alternate version of the track from This Type of Thinking (Could Do Us In)). The album cover is an oil painting made by bassist Dean Bernardini on a 24x48 canvas. "Letter from a Thief" was the second single from the album and began radio airplay on December 7, 2009. "Shameful Metaphors" is the third single from the album and began radio airplay on July 12, 2010. A live performance music video for "Shameful Metaphors" premiered on September 16, 2010.

Recording
Unlike previous albums, Sci-Fi Crimes was recorded live in the studio as a band, without the use of samples. "We wanted to do a record that was more true to what our live sound is like," explains Sam Loeffler. "We wanted to go in the studio and play the tracks and just record them and not make a perfect record the way I think a lot of our records in the past have been made. We wanted to compete on that same level by not tuning the vocals and not tuning every single chord and not adding samples so every single snare hit is exactly the same. We just went in and recorded. It's not a sonically perfect record; it's more like you get if you go into a studio and just play. And I'm curious to see if people notice a difference."

Reception

Tim Grierson at About.com states "...even at its most accessible, the album never lets up on the unease." in regards to what makes the album so good. Jared Johnson of Allmusic says "This is most certainly the same band that draws frequent comparisons to Tool, with its crunchy guitar attack and Loeffler's unforgettable vocal delivery. But it's their ability to pull off such flippant tales with their characteristic punch that gives Sci-Fi Crimes a humanizing appeal not found on their previous records." Sputnikmusic states the album "feels like the fifth installment of music they've produced over their lifetimes." USA Today comments "Sci-Fi Crimes scrapes some of the polish off the band's sound. What remains is both sturdy and versatile".

Track listing

Personnel

Chevelle
 Pete Loeffler – vocals, guitar
 Sam Loeffler – drums
 Dean Bernardini – bass

Production
 Brian Virtue – producer, engineer, mixing
 Chevelle – co-producer
 Kyle Mann – assistant engineer
 John Netti – assistant engineer
 Ted Jensen – mastering

Artwork
 Dean Bernardini – album cover
 Invisible Creature, Inc. – album design
 Jerad Knudson – photography
 Mark Samuels – painting photography

Commercial performance
The album was released on August 31, 2009, debuting at No. 6 on the US Billboard 200 with sales of about 46,000, the highest entry on the chart for the band, before being surpassed by their seventh studio album La Gárgola in 2014. As of January 2013, it has sold over 200,000 copies according to Nielsen Soundscan.

Charts

Weekly charts

Singles

References

2009 albums
Chevelle (band) albums
Epic Records albums